Dhoadhi is a Maldivian web series directed by Ali Seezan. It stars Ahmed Easa, Ansham Mohamed, Aminath Noora and Mohamed Rasheed in main roles. The pilot episode of the first season was released on 14 April 2022 and was concluded on 21 July 2022. It consists of fifteen episodes, each of approximately 20 minutes. The series follows the fate of two troubled humans and how fate makes them cross the sea to attain the love and affection they desire.

Cast and characters

Main
 Mohamed Rasheed as Mohamed; Ayya's father
 Ahmed Easa as Ali Mohamed "Ayya"
 Ansham Mohamed as Manal
 Aminath Noora as Azeeza "Azu"

Recurring
 Moosa Aleef as Hassan
 Mariyam Sana as Sham
 Fathimath Latheefa as Mariyam
 Mohamed Rifshan as Shamin
 Hamza
 Muneez
 Mariyam Waheedha as Shaany
 Ali Azim as Fazil

Episodes

Development
Filming for the series commenced on 21 October 2021 and was scheduled for completion within one month. It was primarily shot in ADh. Fenfushi and ADh. Maamigili. Filming was slightly delayed due to the bad weather, though pre-production was completed in December 2021.

Soundtrack

Release and reception
The first episode of the series was made available for streaming through digital streaming platform Medianet Multi Screen on 14 April 2022. The series received mixed reviews from critics.

References

Serial drama television series
Maldivian television shows
Maldivian web series